The Kanawha River Railroad  is a common-carrier railroad in the United States. A subsidiary of Watco, it leases 309 miles of track in the US states of Ohio and West Virginia from Norfolk Southern. The KNWA also operates an additional 6 miles of track on the southern side of the Kanawha River, where the railroad breaks down, loads, and rebuilds coal trains before handing them off to CSX Transportation. 

The railroad uses rebuilt EMD SD45s and EMD SD60s for manifest trains, EMD GP39-2s for switching and local duties, and their fleet of SD60s as helper power on coal trains, with leased power from Norfolk Southern leading the coal trains.

The railroads roster includes 3 GP-39-2s, No.s 3901, 3902, and 3921.

3 SD45s, mechanically rebuilt into EMD SD40-2s, No.s 4211, 4213, and 4221.

13 SD60s, No.s 6000-6012

References 

Regional railroads in the United States
Ohio railroads
West Virginia railroads
Railway companies established in 2016
Spin-offs of the Norfolk Southern Railway
Watco